Sauverny is a commune in the Ain department in eastern France. It is located between the Jura mountains in France and Lac Leman, bordering the Canton of Geneva, Switzerland.

Population

See also
Communes of the Ain department

References

Communes of Ain
Ain communes articles needing translation from French Wikipedia